is a Japanese team handball player. She plays for the club Hiroshima Maplered, and on the Japanese national team. She represented Japan at the 2013 World Women's Handball Championship in Serbia, where the Japanese team placed 14th.

References

1989 births
Living people
Japanese female handball players